The 1896 Miami Redskins football team was an American football team that represented Miami University during the 1896 college football season. Their coach was Ernest Merrill.

Schedule

References

Miami
Miami RedHawks football seasons
Miami Redskins football